The Head Hunter (originally titled The Head) is a 2018 American fantasy horror film directed by Jordan Downey, who also co-wrote, produced, and edited the film. It stars Norwegian actor Christopher Rygh as the title character, Cora Kaufman, and Aisha Ricketts. The film centers on the title character, who works as a bounty hunter for a local kingdom, all the while he awaits the eventual return of the creature responsible for the murder of his daughter.

Influenced by Jean-Jacques Annaud's 1981 film Quest for Fire, as well as The X-Files, and Tales From the Crypt television series, The Head Hunter was developed by Downey and Kevin Stewart, with the location in mind long before the film's story was eventually developed. The initial concept for the film later came about during a writer's retreat, in which the filmmakers had assembled and hosted at Stewart's family home in Soutelo Mourisco, a small village in Northern Portugal. Norwegian actor Christopher Rygh was cast as the leading role, in his feature-film debut, after filmmakers discovered him while searching a casting website. Principal photography later began in Bragança, Portugal, while additional scenes were shot in Norway, and Mammoth Lakes, California.

The Head Hunter first premiered at the Sitges Film Festival on October 6, 2018, as a part of the festival's "Panorama Fantàstic" section. While the film was screened at Sitges, and Nightmares Film Festival under the title The Head, but the title was later changed to The Head Hunter due to lukewarm reactions. The film would garner several awards and nominations at the various film festivals it was screened at, and received positive reviews from critics upon its release, with many praising the film's atmosphere, cinematography, and Rygh's performance.

Plot
In the Dark Ages, after the death of his daughter, a fierce warrior known simply as "The Father" begins amassing a gruesome collection of heads of monsters he stakes to the wall of his cabin. The Father lives alone in solitude; his only company is his horse Jakke. Most of his time is spent repairing his armor, setting traps for animals, visiting his daughter's grave, and using the blood and organs of monsters to create a healing potion that heals wounds almost instantly.

The Father earns his living as a bounty hunter by hunting down the beasts that terrorize a nearby kingdom. Each time the kingdom has a new bounty, a large horn sounds off, and a new bounty is pinned to a large tree just outside the castle walls. Throughout he is shown taking the bounty, leaving to hunt down his target, then returning with the target's head which he pins to his wall.  Many of these hunts leave The Father wounded and maimed, forcing him to use the elixir to heal himself. During one such hunt, he returns on foot after Jakke is killed. Soon after making a grave for his companion and visiting his daughter’s grave, another bounty is posted. Much to his surprise, it is revealed to be the creature responsible for his daughter's death.

Traveling far north to an island, he finds the monster in a cave. After a hard battle he finally decapitates the monster and travels home to pay respects to his daughter. His victory is short-lived as one of his jars containing the elixir he left near his window is knocked over and spills over the creature's decapitated head, bringing it back to life. Discovering what transpired, The Father prepares to hunt down the revived creature as it searches for a new body.

As nightfall arrives, the Father begins a game of wits against the creature, with it digging up the daughter’s grave and attaching its head to her corpse. After a lengthy chase, the Father seemingly kills the creature by severing its head from his daughter's corpse and stabbing it repeatedly in the head.

Reburying his daughter the next morning, the Father returns home. After cleaning up the mess left from the previous night, he leaves the cabin to begin repairs on his armor. While doing so, he suddenly cries out in shock and pain before going silent. A short time passes and he appears to return to the cabin, carrying what appears to be a severed head which is then pinned onto the wall. The Father's severed head is then revealed to be the one that was pinned to the wall, and the creature, its head now attached to the Father's body, leaves taking one of the jars of elixir along with it, gloating as it walks away saying, “Body Mine!”

Cast
 Christopher Rygh as Father (The Head Hunter), a lone Viking warrior, and bounty hunter tasked with hunting down and eliminating monsters that terrorize the local kingdom
 Cora Kaufman as Daughter, Father's child, who was brutally murdered by a mysterious and deadly creature
 Aisha Ricketts as The Head (voice), a deadly creature responsible for the brutal murder of the Head Hunter's child

Production

Concept and development

The Head Hunter was produced and directed by Jordan Downey, who also co-wrote the film's script.
Downey had previously directed several short films, including the 2014 short Critters: Bounty Hunter (based on the film franchise of the same name), making his feature-film debut with the 2008 comedy-horror film ThanksKilling. After the completeion of several short films, as well as the third film in the Thankskilling series, Downey and his frequent collaborator Kevin Stewart began developing their next project. Initially, the film's story was not immediately forthcoming, as Downey later recalled, "We didn't have the idea first, we just had this drive to make a movie [...] So we just sat down, to see if we could come up with something that we could shoot for a low budget." The initial concept for the film later came about during a writer's retreat, in which the filmmakers had assembled and hosted at Stewart's family home. At the retreat, the filmmakers had envisioned a scene in which a lone warrior carrying a severed head inside a sack, stumbling into a room filled with heads mounted on the walls. With this scene in mind, the filmmakers then developed a forty-page script, which contained very little dialogue, describing it as a  medieval horror film. From the outset, both Downey and Stewart knew that the film would be low budget, and feature a very small cast, which was all factored into the film's script. For inspiration, Jordan Downey and Kevin Stewart have cited Jean-Jacques Annaud's 1981 film Quest for Fire, Robert Eggers' The Witch, as well as The X-Files, and Tales From the Crypt.

Pre-production
Early on in pre-production of the film, the two filmmakers had decided to shoot the film around Stewart's family home in Soutelo Mourisco, a small village in Northern Portugal, due to the remoteness of its location. The filmmakers had wanted to utilize the location for some time, feeling that its remoteness and scenery "would lend itself very well to a horror movie". For the titular character, the filmmakers wanted the role to look and feel authentic, refusing to cast an American actor in the role as they felt that it would not be appropriate for the time period and feared that it would end up 'looking fake'. Norwegian actor Christopher Rygh was later cast as the leading role, in his feature-film debut, after filmmakers discovered him while searching a casting website. Downey later recalled, there was no formal audition for the role, with the filmmakers casting Rygh after having a conversation with the actor in regards to the role.

Construction of the film's props and various monsters in the film commenced before the script was completed, with the filmmakers experimenting with the designs and techniques that would be implemented on a low budget. In creating the look and feel of decomposition in the severed heads featured in the film, the production crew reappropriated many old Halloween masks by staining them and placing layers of melted plastic over them in order to create the effect of rotting flesh. Other props for the film were purchased inexpensively by the production crew the day after Halloween, as Downey recalled "we just bought every medieval thing in there we could find. Every plastic sword or shield, skeletons, and skulls, anything that just looked kind of creepy, crawly, medieval, or metal. We bought it all." The title character's armor was created by Swedish costume designer André Bravin, who fashioned it out of leather. Downey later described the armor as 'being more Leatherface-esque, rather than a Game of Thrones-style vibe', with faces and skin appearing stitched into the entire outfit. The film's main antagonist, referred at the end credits as "The Head", was designed Troy Smith, who had previously worked with Downey in both his Thankskilling series and Critters: Bounty Hunter.

Filming
Principal photography began in Bragança, Portugal, while additional scenes were shot in Norway, and Mammoth Lakes, California. With very little dialogue featured in the film, Downey later stated that he had always been drawn to films that centered more on visual storytelling rather than relying on dialogue to convey the story. In order to combat the film's low budget, the variety of creatures that appear throughout the film are only shown in glimpses or merely implied, the film's low budget also limited the amount of production crew the filmmakers could hire, which, according to Stewart, only consisted of three other people, including himself and Downey. Shooting occasionally proved challenging, as the costumes, and props had to be shot in a certain way in order to "look right on camera", and crew members, including Downey, performing multiple roles during production. The climactic fight sequence was shot in a water mine, after one of Stewart’s cousins suggested it as a possible location to film. The scene was devised as a way to enhance the threat of "The Head", by forcing the title character to fight it at less than full strength, as he is unable to use the weapons that he is accustomed to fighting with.  Shooting at the location, as Downey later stated, proved to be the most difficult, and frustrating portion to shoot, with cast and crew members forced to enter the location one at a time. Later the recalling the cave's conditions, Downey noted: "It was really crammed, dark and there were spiders and water up to our ankles and knees. The torch was putting off fumes and there was no ventilation." Downey later developed a cold after shooting at the location.

Rygh, who had previously starred in the Norwegian short film Ulfberht, was described by Downey as being easy to work with, and never once complained on set.

Release

Theatrical release
The Head Hunter first premiered at the Sitges Film Festival on October 6, 2018 as a part of the festival's "Panorama Fantàstic" section. It was later screened at the Nightmares Film Festival on October 20, 2018.

While the film was screened at Sitges, and Nightmares Film Festival under the title The Head (the name of the film's main antagonist), the title was later changed to The Head Hunter. According to filmmakers Downey and Stewart, the reason for the change was mainly due to lukewarm reactions under the initial name, with the film's distributor, Vertical Entertainment, suggesting a change in the film's title. After "combing through all kinds of medieval literature", the filmmakers later came up with the film's current title. Downey and Stewart were originally against the name change, but later embraced it as they felt the current title shifted the focus from the antagonist to the main character.

Under the new title, the film was screened at the Insólito Festival de Cine de Terror y Fantasía on February 7, 2019. It would also be screened at the Fantasporto Film Festival later that month on the 24th. It received a limited theatrical release on April 5, 2019.

Soundtrack release

Official soundtrack for The Head Hunter was composed by Nick Soole, and was later released on CD and Digital download on April 8, 2019. The soundtrack was a later played as a part of an official selection of Soole's works during the 2019 San Diego Comic Con's "Sounds of Horror" Panel on July 19, 2019.

Track listing

Home media
The Head Hunter was released via Video on Demand, cable, and digital media on April 5, 2019. It was later released on DVD by ADNA Films and Lionsgate on May 7, 2019. It grossed a total of $44,652 in domestic video sales.

Reception

Critical response
The Head Hunter received positive reviews from critics upon its release, with many praising the film's atmosphere, cinematography, and Rygh's performance. On review aggregator Rotten Tomatoes, The Head Hunter holds an approval rating of 95%, based on 19 reviews, and an average rating of 7.20/10.

Sandy Schaefer from Screen Rant wrote, "While he clearly had limited resources to draw from here, Downey is nevertheless able to deliver a mean and lean tale of revenge with a surprisingly rich sense of atmosphere. Armed with a pulpy spirit and plenty of monster gore to go around, The Head Hunter makes for enjoyably gnarly fantasy horror B-movie entertainment."  John Squires of Bloody Disgusting offered the film similar praise, writing, "Brutal, bloody, gnarly and atmospheric as can be, The Head Hunter is medieval horror gold, as well as one of the coolest and craziest horror movies I’ve seen in a long time." Janel Spiegel from HorrorNews.net praised the film's atmosphere, cinematography, as well as the film's suspense, originality, and Rygh's performance. Noel Murray of the Los Angeles Times praised the film's "refreshing simplicity", as well as the cinematography, Rygh's performance, and action sequences.

Jonathan Barkan from Dread Central rated the film four out of five stars, writing, "The Head is a testament to independent filmmaking. Created by a skeleton crew on a meager budget with limited supplies, it is overflowing with imagination and atmosphere." Joblo Jake Dee gave the film a score of nine out of ten, praising the film's atmosphere, visuals, mounting tension, and third act, hailing it as a fine example of low-budget filmmaking. Dee's only criticism was directed towards the 'wandering' second act. Kenneth Lowe of Paste Magazine wrote: "If The Head Hunter had come in with a bigger budget and a different director, there would have been all sorts of attempts at injecting silly lore into this pure and primal tale. It may feature just one or two fight scenes, no cackling wizards or captive princesses, but it manages to evoke that spirit while also telling a straightforward horror story." Gaming and culture website Polygons Rafael Motamayor favorably compared to Sam Raimi's Evil Dead II, and the fantasy video game The Elder Scrolls V: Skyrim. In his review, Motamayor praised the film's production values, practical effects, and atmosphere.

Accolades

References

External links 
 Official website
 
 
 
 

2018 films
2018 horror films
2018 fantasy films
2010s monster movies
American dark fantasy films
American monster movies
2010s English-language films
Films set in the 14th century
Films shot in California
Films shot in Norway
Films shot in Portugal
2010s American films